Carter Hill may refer to:

 Carter Hill (Camden, South Carolina), listed on the NRHP in South Carolina
 Carter Hill (Lebanon, Virginia), listed on the NRHP in Virginia

See also
Carter Hall (disambiguation)